Verdiem was a software corporation based in Seattle, Washington.  Verdiem is offered by Avolin.  The company was backed by venture capital. Verdiem produces the Surveyor 6 enterprise-class PC power management software.  Verdiem Surveyor enables customers to centrally control and reduce the energy used by PCs, Macs, and network devices running Cisco EnergyWise without impacting end users. Nearly 700 corporations, government agencies and universities have deployed Surveyor on over 2 million devices.

Surveyor
Surveyor is Verdiem’s enterprise class PC Power Management software. The product allows the central administration of power management settings for networked PCs. Intelligent policies maximize energy savings by placing machines into a lower power states without interfering with end-user productivity, desktop maintenance or upgrades. More recent releases include a Sustainability Dashboard.

Verdiem announced the Surveyor 6 Spring Edition on March 6, 2012, which allows companies to "more accurately track and manage energy consumption and costs across international boundaries, rates, and currencies"

Case studies

There are number of case studies showing varying amounts of success in energy reduction, including:
a Salix report contrasted similar sized (3,500) PowerMAN and Verdiem projects at the University of Sussex and the University of the West of England with payback periods of 0.5 and 2.5 years respectively.
Cadbury, with a 30% reduction of energy costs
the City of Boston, with a 44% reduction in PC power consumption, saving between $24,000 and $72,000 per year.
the National Institutes of Health, saving an average of 953,678 kWh of electricity or about $71,000 annually.

References

System software